Centar may refer to:

 Centar Municipality (Skopje), a municipality in Skopje, in the Republic of Macedonia.
 Centar Municipality, Sarajevo, a municipality in Sarajevo, in Bosnia and Herzegovina.
Centar, Niš, a neighbourhood of Niš, in Serbia.